Artana, is a village in Telavi district of Georgia.

See also
 Telavi Municipality

References 

Populated places in Telavi Municipality